Tau Beta Sigma Honorary Band Sorority, (colloquially referred to as TBSigma or TBS) is a co-educational service sorority.

The sorority, headquartered at the historic Stillwater Santa Fe Depot in Stillwater, Oklahoma, numbers over 3,800 active members in 160 active chapters, and over 40,000 alumni. Since 1946, Tau Beta Sigma has been recognized by Kappa Kappa Psi as "an equal affiliated organization with a parallel purpose, function and role in the college and university band setting", and the two organizations hold joint conventions. The two organizations contribute to a national publication called, The Podium. Tau Beta Sigma also administers an alumni association open to members and friends of both organizations.

History

Overview

Tau Beta Sigma was founded at Texas Technological College (now Texas Tech University) by Wava Banes (Turner Henry). Due to corporation laws in the state of Texas at the time, however, the Texas Tech sisters surrendered their name, ritual, jewelry, constitution and Alpha chapter designation in January 1946 to the local band sorority at Oklahoma State University. The Alpha chapter of Tau Beta Sigma was installed at OSU on March 26, 1946. This had the additional effect of locating both of the Alpha chapters of Tau Beta Sigma and Kappa Kappa Psi at the same school. The founding members of the Alpha chapter were: Rosemary Wright, Frances Martin, Ebba Jensen, Mary Belle Reece, Margaret Stanffer, Bernice Friend, and Maribeth Crist. Later, on May 4, 1946, the Beta chapter of Tau Beta Sigma was founded at Texas Tech.

Sorority Beginnings

The first practical idea for establishing a “band sorority” for college and university bandswomen came about during the spring semester of 1939. Wava Banes, along with two of her classmates (Emily SoRelle and Ruth La Nell Williams), took the idea to director D. O. Wiley of the Texas Technological College Band.  The idea, patterned after Kappa Kappa Psi, began to come together the following semester and resulted in the campus organization Tau Beta Sigma.  Much like the Fraternity, Tau Beta Sigma's purpose at Tech was to serve as an honorary service and leadership recognition society, but was designed especially to provide the important additional social, educational, and other positive experiences needed by women in the band.  The fledgling organization petitioned for recognition as an official campus organization from Dean of Women Mary Doak in spring 1940.

During these initial meetings of 1939–40, the women elected officers and began work on sorority crests and jewelry.  The first officers of the organization were:  president, Wava Banes; vice-president, Emily SoRelle; secretary, Lillian Horner; treasurer, Nita Furr; reporter, Barbara Griggs; and faculty sponsor, D. O. Wiley.  Miss SoRelle provided all of the sketch work on the emblem and shield that were adopted as the official emblems of the sorority.  However, two of the founding members, Wava and Emily, graduated at the end of the spring 1940 term.  As band enrollment changed due to participation in World War II, the girls of the Tech Bands continued to develop the fledgling organization.  By October 1941, TBS had begun communications with the national executive secretary of Kappa Kappa Psi for assistance in becoming a national organization.

In June 1943, the Tech women petitioned the Grand Council of Kappa Kappa Psi to become an auxiliary part of the national fraternity as an active chapter. Accepting the group under these circumstances, however, would have entailed a complete revision of the Kappa Kappa Psi constitution. With World War II in progress, it was unsure as to when the National Chapter would hold their next convention where the issue could be brought to debate. Rather than postponing action on the women's request indefinitely, the women at Texas Tech approached A. Frank Martin, Grand Executive Secretary of Kappa Kappa Psi, in January 1946 to provide assistance in forming their own national organization, just as the National Fraternity had done in 1919. Until a national convention of Kappa Kappa Psi could be held and the matter clarified, Tau Beta Sigma could be considered the “sister organization” of the fraternity. The Grand Council of Kappa Kappa Psi agreed that Tau Beta Sigma could share in all fraternal publications.

Through the assistance of A. Frank Martin, the ritual and national constitution were completed.  Likewise, the Balfour Company completed designs for the sorority badge and pledge pin.  When applying for a national charter, D. O. Wiley and the girls at Texas Tech again turned to A. Frank Martin and offered to turn over their work and the name Tau Beta Sigma to the women's band sorority at Oklahoma A&M, known as Kappa Psi, to submit the articles of incorporation in Oklahoma.  Through this act, the chapter at Oklahoma A&M would become the Alpha chapter.  As part of this agreement, the chapter at Texas Tech, Beta, would be known as the founding location of the sorority and the members stipulated that Wava Banes would be known as the founder, the agreement also specified that the 1st national president would be from the Beta chapter.

Similar women's organizations at Colorado University and the University of Oklahoma submitted petitions to join with the Texas Tech and O.A.M.C. chapter prior to the official charter being received.  On March 26, 1946, a charter was granted by the Department of State for the State of Oklahoma legally establishing “Tau Beta Sigma, National Honorary Band Sorority,” later amended to “Tau Beta Sigma.” On May 4 of 1946, the members of the Alpha chapter traveled to Lubbock, Texas, to officially install the women of Texas Tech as the Beta chapter of the National Sorority.

Since that time, Tau Beta Sigma has expanded to over 230 campuses across the United States.

Ties to other organizations

In addition to the close relationship with Kappa Kappa Psi, Tau Beta Sigma has historical and current relationships with several other organizations. One such relationship is with Sigma Alpha Iota, an international fraternity for women with a strong interest in music.

In 1999, joint statements were issued by the leadership of Tau Beta Sigma and Sigma Alpha Iota, along with Kappa Kappa Psi and Phi Mu Alpha Sinfonia, affirming "that there are equally important roles for Phi Mu Alpha Sinfonia, Sigma Alpha Iota, Kappa Kappa Psi and Tau Beta Sigma to fulfill on any campus where our chapters mutually exist, now or in the future. Each organization possesses a distinct mission and, as a result, fulfills a unique and vital role in the musical environment of a college campus" and that "A member of Phi Mu Alpha Sinfonia or Sigma Alpha Iota can hold simultaneous membership in Kappa Kappa Psi or Tau Beta Sigma, subject to his/her own interests and the eligibility requirements of the other organizations. The same holds true for a member of Kappa Kappa Psi or Tau Beta Sigma with regard to membership in Phi Mu Alpha Sinfonia or Sigma Alpha Iota."

Programs

National Programs

Women in Music Series

Crescendo

Bandswomen Networking Program

Joint Programs with Kappa Kappa Psi

National Intercollegiate Band 

The National Intercollegiate Band (NIB) is a concert band, sponsored by honorary band fraternity and sorority Kappa Kappa Psi and Tau Beta Sigma, that performs every two years at the national convention of the two organizations. Organized in 1947, the NIB is the oldest national intercollegiate band in the United States and is open to all collegiate band members regardless of membership in Kappa Kappa Psi or Tau Beta Sigma.

Commissioning Program 

Since 1953, Kappa Kappa Psi and Tau Beta Sigma have commissioned a new work for wind band to be premiered at almost every National Intercollegiate Band concert. This program was begun to add to the wind repertoire under the direction of Grand President Hugh McMillen, and is the longest-running commissioning project in the United States. A number of these commissioned compositions have garnered national acclaim, including Robert Russell Bennett's Symphonic Songs for Band and Karel Husa's Concerto for Trumpet and Wind Orchestra. In the years following the start of the national commissioning program, local chapters have begun to commission new band works themselves, such as Frank Ticheli's An American Elegy, in memory of the Columbine High School massacre.

National Leadership

National Headquarters
Originally located on the campus of Oklahoma State University, the National Headquarters of Tau Beta Sigma is housed in Stillwater Station, the retired Stillwater Santa Fe Depot in Stillwater, Oklahoma. The headquarters staff carries out the day-to-day operations of the Sorority.

The headquarters staff includes:

National Council
The national officers of Tau Beta Sigma for the 2021-2023 biennium are:

Board of Trustees
There are currently eight members of the Tau Beta Sigma Board of Trustees. The Board of Trustees represents the corporation in all matters and ensures the corporation remains financially sound by directing the finances of the trust.

The current Board of Trustees members for Tau Beta Sigma are:

Tau Beta Sigma Alumni Association Executive Council

The current Executive Council members for the Tau Beta Sigma Alumni Association are:

National Presidents of Tau Beta Sigma

Districts

The sorority is divided into three basic levels - national, district, and chapter. The sorority's business is handled hierarchically, so that an issue is handled in chapter meetings, district conventions, and then nationally. There are seven districts divided by geography: Northeast, Southeast, North Central, Midwest, Southwest, Western, and International (a hypothetical district comprising all chapters outside the United States). Each district is led by one or more district counselors, as well as a council of elected student officers by the members of the districts.

District counselors are regional advisors for the sorority. They actively work with each district's student leadership and communicate with chapter sponsors. District counselors are appointed by the national president for two-year terms, and are currently limited to serving three terms.

The districts are as follows:

Notable members
Notable members of Tau Beta Sigma include:

See also 
 Kappa Kappa Psi
 List of works commissioned by Kappa Kappa Psi or Tau Beta Sigma
 List of Kappa Kappa Psi and Tau Beta Sigma national conventions

References

 
Student organizations established in 1946
National Interfraternity Music Council
Oklahoma State University
Texas Tech University
1946 establishments in Texas
Music organizations based in the United States
Professional Fraternity Association